Derrick Brant May (born July 14, 1968) is a former outfielder who played for the Chicago Cubs (1990–94), Milwaukee Brewers (1995), Houston Astros (1995–96), Philadelphia Phillies (1997), Montreal Expos (1998) and Baltimore Orioles (1999). He also played three seasons in Japan, from  until , for the Chiba Lotte Marines. He was the assistant hitting coach for the St. Louis Cardinals in 2016. He was the manager of the Frederick Keys of the MLB Draft League in 2021. Currently is the Organization Hitting Coordinator for SSG Lander’s in Korea.

May batted left-handed and threw right-handed. After signing to play football and baseball at Virginia Tech, May was drafted by the Chicago Cubs in the first round (#9 overall) of the 1986 June draft, at the age of 17. May hit .320 (3rd), .298 (11th), .305 (5th), .295 (5th), and .296 (5th) and was a Carolina League and Southern League All-Star before making his major league debut. May enjoyed an 18-year professional baseball career, including ten seasons in the major leagues.  He was a .271 hitter with 52 home runs and 310 RBI in 797 major league games played. In Japan, he hit an additional 59 home runs in just three seasons, batting .274.

May was the 1993 Delaware Athlete of the Year, a 2014 Delaware Sports Hall of Fame inductee and a 2015 Delaware Afro-American Hall of Fame inductee.

Derrick May is the son of major league outfielder Dave May. His brother, David May, Jr., is a major league scout for the Toronto Blue Jays. His son Donovan is a scout for the Boston Red Sox.

Coaching career
May was an Assistant MLB hitting coach/hitting coordinator and minor league hitting coach in the St. Louis Cardinals Organization from 2005 to 2016.

2005: Coached the Palm Beach Cardinals (High A) to the Florida State League Championship his first year in 2005.
2006: Won both halves and made playoffs in the Florida State League.
2007: Promoted to (Double A) Springfield, Mo. of the Texas League and coached them to the Texas League championship finals. The team led the league in hitting (.271), hits and on-base percentage (.345), and was second in runs scored, home runs, slugging (.431) and on-base plus slugging percentage (.776).
2008: Coached Springfield to the second best record in the league. The team batted .275, was first in home runs, and tied for second in hits and total bases.
2009: Won the first half in Northern division. Lost in the first round of the playoffs. His team led the league in home runs and tied for second in triples. 
2010: Was the Springfield hitting coach.  The team finished with the second best record in the league at 76–64, and tied for second in batting at .264, first in home runs with 146, second in doubles, runs scored, total bases, walks, on-base percentage, slugging, and on-base plus slugging.
2011-2016: St. Louis Cardinals organizational minor league hitting coordinator.
2014: Awarded the Organizations George Kissell award for excellence in player development.
2016: Named assistant hitting coach for the St. Louis Cardinals after third-base coach Jose Oquendo was placed on medical leave of absence.
2017: Began working for the Colorado Rockies organization as their hitting coach for the Lancaster JetHawks in the California League. Where the team were the first and second half champions of the South Division 79-61.  The Jayhawks led the league in hitting, hits and stolen bases.

On April 12, 2021, May was announced as the manager of the Frederick Keys, a collegiate summer baseball team of the MLB Draft League.

January 2022, May was named Organization Hitting Coordinator for The SSG Lander’s baseball club in Korea.

Best season
: .295 batting average, 10 home runs, 77 runs batted in, 62 runs, 25 doubles, 10 stolen bases, 128 games – all career-highs.

See also
List of second-generation Major League Baseball players
http://probaseballinsider.com/cardinals-derrick-may-1/
 List of St. Louis Cardinals coaches

References

External links

Baseball Library
Retrosheet

https://www.milb.com/milb/news/toolshed-most-impressive-minor-league-baseball-lineups-staffs/c-230762972/t-185364810
https://www.milb.com/milb/news/colorado-rockies-prospect-brendan-rodgers-gets-three-more-hits/c-229967494/t-185364810

1968 births
Living people
African-American baseball players
American expatriate baseball players in Canada
American expatriate baseball players in Japan
Baltimore Orioles players
Baseball players from New York (state)
Charlotte Knights players
Chiba Lotte Marines players
Chicago Cubs players
Houston Astros players
Iowa Cubs players
Major League Baseball outfielders
Milwaukee Brewers players
Montreal Expos players
Ottawa Lynx players
Peoria Chiefs players
Philadelphia Phillies players
Rochester Red Wings players
Sportspeople from Rochester, New York
Wytheville Cubs players
Winston-Salem Spirits players
21st-century African-American people
20th-century African-American sportspeople